California School of Management and Leadership is a private, non-profit business school recognized by the United States Department of Education and accredited by the WASC and the Accrediting Commission for Senior Colleges and Universities. The school is part of Alliant International University and is named for one of the world’s leading organizational consultants and executive coaches Marshall Goldsmith.

In 2003, California School of Management and Leadership was ranked 3rd in the Best Business Schools Rankings of Finance (Princeton Review 2008) and has also been ranked among the Top 20 Leadership Development Programs in the United States (Leadership Excellence Magazine 2010).

There is only one Marshall Goldsmith School of Management certified professional in Canada at this time.

Programs

Bachelor's level
BS in Business Administration
BS in Project Management

Master's level
Accelerated MBA: Executive Format
MA in International Relations
MA in Organizational Behavior
MA in Organizational Psychology
Master of Arts in Industrial-Organizational Psychology
Master of Arts in Organizational Development
Master of Business Administration (MBA)
Master of International Business Administration (I-MBA)

Doctoral level
Doctor of Business Administration
PhD in Consulting Psychology
PhD in Industrial Organizational Psychology
PhD in Leadership
PhD in Organizational Psychology
PsyD in Organizational Development

Locations
San Diego
San Francisco
Los Angeles
Sacramento
Fresno
Irvine
Mexico City

References

 Good University Ranking Guide

External links
 

Alliant International University
Business schools in California
Private universities and colleges in California